Lewis Tarleton Massey (13 February 1869 – 18 June 1944) was an Australian rules footballer who played with Melbourne in the Victorian Football League (VFL).

Notes

External links 

1869 births
Australian rules footballers from Victoria (Australia)
Melbourne Football Club players
1944 deaths
Melbourne Football Club (VFA) players
Australian rules footballers from Tasmania